Frithjof Prydz (5 November 1841 – 21 May 1935) was a Norwegian judge.

Personal life 
Prydz was born in Moss to Paul Fredrik Prydz and Andersine Lund, and was a brother of writer Alvilde Prydz.

Career
Prydz graduated as cand.jur. in 1863, and was named as a Supreme Court Justice from 1900 to 1918. He served as mayor of Hønefoss, and was decorated as Knight, First Class of the Order of St. Olav in 1900.

References

1841 births
1935 deaths
People from Moss, Norway
Supreme Court of Norway justices